Defending champion Pete Sampras defeated Michael Chang in the final, 6–1, 6–4, 7–6(7–3) to win the men's singles tennis title at the 1996 US Open. Sampras saved a match point en route to the title, in the quarterfinals against Àlex Corretja. There, Sampras had a stomach bug and vomited during the fifth set, prompting a warning from the referee for delaying the match. He eventually won the fifth set in a tiebreak, 7–6(9–7).

In the draw for the tournament, there were accusations of American favoritism as world No. 3 Michael Chang, world No. 8 Andre Agassi, and world No. 9 Jim Courier (all Americans) were seeded above their world ranking at numbers 2, 6, and 8 respectively. Other players were seeded above their world ranking, including world No. 6 Goran Ivanišević (seeded at number 4) and world No. 7 Richard Krajicek (seeded at number 5). Conversely, other players were seeded below their world ranking, including world No. 2 Thomas Muster (seeded at number 3), world No. 5 Boris Becker (seeded at number 6), and world No. 4 Yevgeny Kafelnikov (seeded at number 7). Becker withdrew from the tournament with an injury, and Kafelnikov withdrew from the tournament in protest of the seeding.

This marked the last major appearance of Stefan Edberg; he lost to Ivanišević in the quarterfinals.

Seeds
The seeded players are listed below. Pete Sampras is the champion; others show the round in which they were eliminated.

Qualifying

Draw

Final eight

Top half

Section 1

Section 2

Section 3

Section 4

Bottom half

Section 5

Section 6

Section 7

Section 8

External links
 Association of Tennis Professionals (ATP) – 1996 US Open Men's Singles draw
1996 US Open – Men's draws and results at the International Tennis Federation

Men's singlesMen's singles
US Open (tennis) by year – Men's singles